Blokland may refer to:

 Blokland (surname), including "Van Blokland"
 Blokland, South Holland, a village in the Netherlands
 Blokland, Utrecht, a village in the Netherlands

See also
 Hoogblokland, a village and former municipality in South Holland
 Laagblokland, a village and former municipality in South Holland
 Blockland (disambiguation)